The Pavilion Burns (French: Le Pavillon brûle) is a 1941 French comedy drama directed by Jacques de Baroncelli, written by Solange Térac, starring Pierre Renoir and Jean Marais.

The film's sets were designed by the art director Serge Piménoff.

Plot 
Ramsay, an engineer, works in a copper mine in a French colony. He is confronted by a variety of huge technical and human problems.

Cast 
 Pierre Renoir as Jourdinsse
 Jean Marais as Daniel
 Bernard Blier as Benezy
 Michèle Alfa as Odette
 Marcel Herrand as Audignane
 Jean Marchat as Risay, engineer
 Marcel Pérès
 Lucien Coëdel
 Maurice Teynac
 Jean Carmet

External links 
 

1941 films
French comedy-drama films
1940s French-language films
French black-and-white films
Films directed by Jacques de Baroncelli
1941 comedy-drama films
1940s French films